Xenophont Andreev Ivanov (6 September 1898 – 22 January 1967) was a Bulgarian veterinary scholar of pathological morphology.

He earned a degree in veterinary medicine in Berlin in 1925. He was dean of the faculty of Veterinary Medicine from 1945 to 1948 and was the first rector of the Agricultural Academy from 1948 to 1953 in Sofia. 

Ivanov was also the founding director of the Institute of Comparative Animal Pathology, which is a predecessor to today's Institute of Experimental Pathology and Parasitology. Beginning in 1952, he was a full member (academician) of the Bulgarian Academy of Sciences. He also served on the editorial board of Pathologia Veterinaria.

Ivanov's research focused on linguatulosis, sheep pox, equine infectious anaemia, bovine enzootic pneumonia, and osteomyelosclerosis in poultry.

External links 
 Institute of Experimental Pathology and Parasitology
 Bulgarian Academy of Sciences

People from Ruse, Bulgaria
Bulgarian veterinarians
Members of the Bulgarian Academy of Sciences
1898 births
1967 deaths
Bulgarian pathologists